Jessica Diane Aber (born 1981) is an American lawyer who is the United States attorney for the Eastern District of Virginia.

Education 

Aber received her Bachelor of Arts, magna cum laude, from the University of Richmond in 2003 and her Juris Doctor from William & Mary Law School in 2006.

Career 

Aber began her legal career as a law clerk for then-Magistrate Judge M. Hannah Lauck of the United States District Court for the Eastern District of Virginia from 2006 to 2007. From 2007 to 2008, she was an associate at McGuireWoods. From 2009 to 2021, she was an assistant United States attorney in the United States Attorney's Office for the Eastern District of Virginia. From 2015 to 2016, she served on a detail assignment as Counsel to the Assistant Attorney General for the Criminal Division of the United States Department of Justice. Since 2016, she has been the deputy chief of the criminal division for the office.

U.S. attorney for the Eastern District of Virginia 

In March 2021, Senators Tim Kaine and Mark Warner recommended Aber and one other candidate to the White House. On August 10, 2021, President Joe Biden nominated Aber to be the United States attorney for the Eastern District of Virginia. On September 30, 2021, her nomination was reported out of committee by voice vote. On October 5, 2021, her nomination was confirmed in the United States Senate by voice vote. She received her commission on October 7, 2021, and was sworn in on October 12, 2021, by Chief Judge Mark Steven Davis and Judge M. Hannah Lauck.

References

External links
 Biography at U.S. Department of Justice

1981 births
Living people
21st-century American women lawyers
21st-century American lawyers
Assistant United States Attorneys
McGuireWoods people
People from Walnut Creek, California
United States Attorneys for the Eastern District of Virginia
United States Department of Justice lawyers
Virginia lawyers